Centro Médico is an underground metro station on the Mexico City Metro.  It is  located in the Cuauhtémoc borough of Mexico City. It is a transfer station for both Lines 3 and 9.

General information
The station logo represents the caduceus, a variant of the Rod of Aesculapius, the Greek god of medicine. Its name refers to the Centro Médico Siglo XXI general hospital, located above the metro station. The station opened along Line 3 on 7 June 1980 when Centro Médico served briefly as the southern terminus of that line.  Line 3 service then extended further southward toward Zapata a year later by 25 August 1980. The Centro Médico Siglo XXI was almost destroyed by the 1985 earthquake. The station served as the western terminus of Line 9 (which went east towards Pantitlán) starting on 26 August 1987. Westward service on Line 9 toward Tacubaya started a year later on 29 August 1988.

The station is directly connected to the main entrance of Centro Médico by a set of escalators. This metro station has facilities for the handicapped, a cultural display, and an information desk.

Centro Médico serves the Roma Sur, Doctores and Buenos Aires neighbourhoods.  It is located at the intersection of Avenida Cuauhtemoc and Eje 3 Sur Baja California, just a block north of Viaducto Miguel Alemán, an important east-west highway. The southern exits at the Line 3 end of the station are close to the historic Panteón Francés (French Cemetery) in which important civil and military Mexican figures are buried.

Ridership

References

External links 
 

Mexico City Metro Line 3 stations
Railway stations opened in 1980
1980 establishments in Mexico
1987 establishments in Mexico
Railway stations opened in 1987
Mexico City Metro Line 9 stations
Mexico City Metro stations in Cuauhtémoc, Mexico City
Accessible Mexico City Metro stations